Vesical refers to the urinary bladder and its relevant and nearby structures and functions, including:

 the vesical arteries, which provide the urinary bladder with oxygenated blood
 Superior vesical artery
 Middle vesical artery
 Inferior vesical artery
 the vesical venous plexus, the network of veins that collects deoxygenated blood from the urinary bladder
 the vesical veins, tributaries of the internal iliac veins, which drain the vesical venous plexus
 the vesical nervous plexus, a nerve network in the anterior pelvis
 the vesico-uterine pouch (or vesico-uterine excavation), a sac in the female pelvis in between the uterus and the urinary bladder
 Vesical tenesmus, difficulty urinating

See also 

 Vesicle (disambiguation)